Mike Myburg (born 23 June 1953 in Uitenhage, South Africa) is a former professional tennis player from South Africa. He enjoyed most of his tennis success while playing doubles. During his career, he won one doubles title.

Career finals

Doubles: 2 (1–1)

References

External links
 
 

1953 births
Living people
People from Uitenhage
South African male tennis players
White South African people
Sportspeople from the Eastern Cape